Surb Astvatsatsin of Areni (meaning the "Holy Mother of God Church"; also Areni Church ) is a single-nave two-aisled domed church completed in the year 1321. It is located atop a plateau overlooking the Arpa River and the village of Areni in the Vayots Dzor Province of Armenia.

Architecture 
S. Astvatsatsin is a domed-hall type church with a single drum and a conical umbrella type dome resting above.  Two portals lead into the structure from the south and west.  An effigy of the Virgin Mary is carved upon the tympanum in high-relief above the lintel of  the west portal.  This carving and many others that may be found on the church are considered to be masterpieces of artwork done by Momik Vardpet, who according to inscriptions was also the architect for the church.  He is best known for his high-relief carvings at the monastery of Noravank, located approximately 6 kilometers southeast from Areni. Upon the tympanum above the lintel of the southern portal are the carvings of crosses.

In the center of the church interior, arched pendentives support the drum and dome above. High-relief carvings of mythical creatures adorn each of the four stone panels between the pendentives and base of the drum. Small vertical windows around the drum as well as small windows at each of the four façades let light into the main floor below. A semi-circular apse is located at the eastern wall of the structure and small "studies" or prayer rooms are adjacent on either side. The arched window above the apse is divided by a single column for decorative and structural purposes.

Some interesting tombstones and khachkars may be seen adjacent to the church.  Nearby are also the 13th century ruins of lord Tarsaitch Orbelian of Syunik's palace, moved from Yeghegis to Areni during that time.  Ruins of a 13th-century bridge built by Bishop Sarkis in 1265-1287 are to the northeast one kilometer. At the same location are the remains of an older bridge.

Gallery

See also 
 Noravank monastery, located southeast of Areni Church.

Bibliography

External links 

 Armeniapedia.org: Areni Church 
 Armenica.org: Church of Holy Virgin in Areni
 About Areni Church

Armenian Apostolic churches in Armenia
14th-century churches in Armenia
Areni